Charles Henri Joseph Leickert (22 September 1816, Brussels – 5 December 1907, Mainz) was a Belgian painter of Dutch landscapes. As a specialist in winter landscapes, he explored the nuances of the evening sky and the rosy-fingered dawn.

Biography
Charles Leickert first learned painting in The Hague under the supervision of landscape painters Bartholomeus van Hove, Wijnand Nuijen, and Andreas Schelfhout, among many others. Leickert specialised in winter scenes, sometimes romanticising the sky in pale blues and bright pinks, but he is equally well known for numerous cityscapes. He painted almost all of his works in the Netherlands, in The Hague from 1841 to 1846 and in Amsterdam from 1849 to 1883. In 1856, he became a member of the Royal Academy of Amsterdam. At the age of 71 he moved to Mainz, Germany, where he died in 1907.

References

Further reading
 P. & V. Berko, "Dictionary of Belgian painters born between 1750 & 1875", Knokke 1981, pp. 414–415.

External links
 
 Charles Leickert at Artcyclopedia
 Winter at the IJ Amsterdam, Rijksmuseum
 Charles Leickert paintings
 Boymans van Beuningen collection work by Leickert

1816 births
1907 deaths
Belgian painters
19th-century Dutch painters
Dutch male painters
Landscape artists
Artists from Brussels
19th-century Dutch male artists